Hetereucosma is a genus of moths of the family Tortricidae.

Species
Hetereucosma fasciaria Zhang & Li, 2006
Hetereucosma fuscusiptera Zhang & Li, 2006
Hetereucosma rectangula Zhang & Li, 2006
Hetereucosma trapezia Zhang & Li, 2006

See also
List of Tortricidae genera

References

External links
tortricidae.com

Tortricidae genera
Eucosmini